Espin, also known as autosomal recessive deafness type 36 protein or ectoplasmic specialization protein, is a protein that in humans is encoded by the ESPN gene. Espin is a microfilament binding protein.

Function 

Espin is a multifunctional actin-bundling protein. It plays a major role in regulating the organization, dimensions, dynamics, and signaling capacities of the actin filament-rich, microvillus-type specializations that mediate sensory transduction in various mechanosensory and chemosensory cells.

Clinical significance 

Mutations in this gene are associated with autosomal recessive neurosensory deafness, autosomal dominant sensorineural deafness without vestibular involvement, and DFNB36.

References

Further reading

External links